Seventh Tree is the fourth studio album by English electronic music duo Goldfrapp, released on 22 February 2008 by Mute Records. It was named after a dream Alison Goldfrapp had about a "very large tree". Taking inspiration from paganism and surreal English children's books, Goldfrapp described the album as a "sensual counterpoint to the glitterball glamour of Supernature", their previous studio album from 2005.

Seventh Tree became the duo's most critically acclaimed album since their 2000 debut Felt Mountain, with critics praising their new sound and their bravery for abandoning the dance atmosphere of their previous two albums. The album debuted at number two on the UK Albums Chart with 46,945 copies sold in its first week.

Four singles were released from the album. "A&E" was released as the lead single on 11 February 2008, peaking at number 10 on the UK Singles Chart. The album's second single, "Happiness", peaked at number 25 on the UK chart, while the third single, "Caravan Girl", reached number 54. "Clowns" was released as the fourth and final single, charting at number 115 in the UK.

Critical reception

Seventh Tree received generally positive reviews from music critics. At Metacritic, which assigns a normalised rating out of 100 to reviews from mainstream publications, the album received an average score of 78, based on 32 reviews. Barney Hoskyns of The Observer commented that the duo "have made an album as hummably lovely as it is knowingly referencing of a certain tradition of neo-psychedelic English whimsy." Genevieve Koski of The A.V. Club noted that the album is "buoyed by an underlying pop sensibility, epitomized by the bubbly 'A&E;' and 'Caravan Girl'", concluding, "After the group's hit-or-miss synth-pop detour, Seventh Tree situates Goldfrapp where it was always meant to be." John Murphy of musicOMH viewed it as Goldfrapp's "most subtle, affecting and rewarding album to date" and compared it to Kate Bush and the Cocteau Twins. At AllMusic, Heather Phares praised the album's "electro hippie-chic" as the duo's "most polished and luxe work yet". John Lewis of Uncut called it "brave, bonkers, often beautiful, sometimes haunting and occasionally ridiculous".

Adrien Begrand of PopMatters found that Seventh Tree "might be a quieter and more introspective disc than we'd been expecting, but this is still a quintessential Goldfrapp album with Gregory's arrangements brilliantly underscoring the inimitable vocal versatility of his female foil." Despite being critical of Alison Goldfrapp's "wispy, ethereal, often impenetrable vocal approach", Dave Hughes of Slant Magazine opined that the album is "most compelling for the way in which the band's regained austerity and naturalism contrasts with their more recent hedonism." Kat Lister of NME expressed that "Seventh Tree is bound to ruffle a few electro-feathered fans, but there's no denying it's a venture that sets the pair into new experimental territory." In a mixed review, Rolling Stones Christian Hoard felt that the "slow pace can be a snooze", but wrote that the album "still makes for good post-party chill-out music". Nate Patrin of Pitchfork was less impressed, stating that the album's ambience is "so subtle and slow-moving it doesn't seem to go anywhere, and it coasts on some frothy sense of pleasantness that evaporates the moment the song ends."

Q magazine ranked the album at number 19 on its list of The 50 Best Albums of 2008. PopMatters placed it at number 54 on its list of The Best Albums of 2008. Ben Rayner of the Toronto Star included the album on his list of "rock music that stuck in 2008".

Commercial performance
Seventh Tree debuted at number two on the UK Albums Chart, selling 46,945 copies in its first week. It was certified gold by the British Phonographic Industry (BPI) within four days of release, on 29 February 2008. As of March 2010, the album had sold 200,062 copies in the United Kingdom. The album reached the top 10 in Belgium and Ireland, and the top 20 in Australia, Norway, Portugal and Switzerland.

Seventh Tree became Goldfrapp's second release to chart on the Billboard 200 in the United States, where it debuted at number 48 with first-week sales of 15,000 copies. As of December 2009, it had sold 59,000 copies in the United States. The album also peaked at number 28 on the Canadian Albums Chart.

Special edition
A special edition of Seventh Tree was released on 3 November 2008, featuring new album artwork, photographs and a DVD. The album artwork depicted Goldfrapp dressed as a clown and hugging a tree, as well as Gregory dressed as an owl. The DVD contained music videos, behind-the-scenes footage and several live performances filmed at the De La Warr Pavilion in Bexhill-on-Sea in June 2008.

Track listing

Personnel
Credits adapted from the liner notes of Seventh Tree.

Goldfrapp
 Alison Goldfrapp
 Will Gregory

Additional musicians

 Nick Ingman – string orchestration, string conducting
 Everton Nelson – string leader
 Aidan Love – additional programming ; keys 
 Nick Batt – additional drum programming 
 Max Dingle – additional drum programming 
 Richard Evans – guitars 
 Steve Evans – acoustic guitar 
 Flood – keys ; guitar 
 Chris Goulstone – drum samples ; guitars 
 Tony Hoffer – bass 
 Charlie Jones – bass ; twang bass 
 Alex Lee – acoustic guitar ; electric guitar, bass ; Nashville guitar 
 Justin Meldal-Johnsen – bass 
 Kit Morgan – acoustic guitar 
 Andrew Murphy – acoustic guitar 
 Damon Reece – drums ; percussion 
 Simon Rogers – Indian guitar 
 Adrian Utley – fuzz bass, fuzz guitar 
 Ruth Wall – harp samples 
 Denny Weston Jr. – drums 
 Metro Voices – choir 
 Jenny O'Grady – choir master 
 Strings 
 Everton Nelson, Jackie Shave, Boguslaw Kostecki, Ann Morfee, Chris Tombling, Mark Berrow, Cathy Thompson, Debbie Widdup, Alexander Bălănescu, Stephen Morris, Chris Clad, Tom Pigott-Smith, Dermot Crehan, Sonia Slany, Joanathan Rees, Patrick Kiernan – violin
 Jon Thorne, Peter Lale, Andy Parker, Katie Wilkinson, Chris Pitsilides – viola
 David Daniels, Cathy Giles, Chris Worsey, Melissa Phelps, Robin Firman, Paul Kegg – cello
 Mary Scully, Paddy Lannigan – double bass

Technical
 Alison Goldfrapp – recording, production ; mixing 
 Will Gregory – recording, production ; mixing 
 Flood – co-production ; additional production ; mixing ; additional stems mixing 
 Tony Hoffer – mixing ; overdub engineering 
 Bill Mims – mixing assistance ; overdub engineering 
 Tim Oliver – additional engineering, additional recording
 Jonathan Allen – strings recording
 Stephen Marshall – strings recording assistance
 Stephen Marcussen – mastering

Artwork
 Alison Goldfrapp – art direction, owl drawing
 Mat Maitland – art direction, design
 Serge Leblon – photography
 Cathy Edwards – art direction

Charts

Weekly charts

Year-end charts

Certifications

Release history

Notes

References

2008 albums
Albums produced by Flood (producer)
Downtempo albums
Dream pop albums by English artists
Folktronica albums
Goldfrapp albums
Mute Records albums